Bérénice Lim Marlohe (born 19 May 1979) is a French actress. She played anti-heroine Bond girl Sévérine in the twenty-third James Bond film Skyfall. Her television credits include Père et Maire, Femmes de loi, and Equipe médicale d’urgence. She had an uncredited role in the French comedy Happiness Never Comes Alone with Sophie Marceau. She is also a brand ambassador for Omega Watches.

Early life
Marlohe was born in Paris. Her father, a doctor who moved from Cambodia to France, is of Cambodian and Chinese descent, and her mother, a teacher, is French. Lim is her paternal grandmother's surname. She originally held aspirations of becoming a pianist, as well as an artist, studying at the French arts school Conservatoire de Paris for ten years.

Career
Marlohe first appeared in 2007 in a French short film titled La discordance before appearing in French TV series such as Pas de secrets entre nous (2008), Femmes de loi (2008), R.I.S, police scientifique (2009), and Père et maire (2009). She appeared twice in the French crime series R.I.S, police scientifique, once in 2009 and once in 2012. In 2012 she played the date of Laurent, played by Maurice Barthélémy, in Happiness Never Comes Alone.

She is best known for her role as Bond girl Sévérine in 2012's twenty-third James Bond film Skyfall. A strong believer in fate, she stated that she dreamt of acting alongside Javier Bardem six months before her Bond audition, and that after the dream, she knew everything would be fine. It was not until the second audition for Skyfall that she learned Bardem might also be cast. She starred in the 2015 film 5 to 7 and appeared in the 2017 film Song to Song alongside Ryan Gosling, Natalie Portman, and Rooney Mara.

Filmography

Film

Television

References

External links

 

1979 births
French film actresses
French people of Chinese descent
French people of Cambodian descent
French television actresses
Living people
21st-century French actresses
Actresses from Paris